Alor language may refer to:

One of the Alor–Pantar languages, a group of non-Austronesian languages
Alorese, an Austronesian language spoken on Alor Island

See also 
 Alur language, a Nilotic language of Uganda and the DRC